Sir David Andrew Foxton (born 14 October 1965) is a British High Court judge.

Education 
Foxton was educated at Glasgow Academy. He took a first-class BA in jurisprudence and BCL from Magdalen College, Oxford, in 1986 and 1987 respectively. He was an Eldon Scholar in 1989 and completed a PhD at King's College London in 2001.

Career 
He was called to the bar at Gray's Inn in 1989. He established a practice in commercial law, based at Essex Court Chambers from 1989 to 2020. He took silk in 2006. In addition to practice, he wrote several books. He was editor, with Sir Bernard Eder, of Scrutton on Charterparties and Bills of Lading from 2008 to 2015. He wrote Revolutionary Lawyers: Sinn Fein and Crown Courts in Britain and Ireland 1916–1923 in 2008  and The Life of T. E. Scrutton, concerning the former Lord Justice of Appeal Thomas Edward Scrutton, in 2013.

He has been a visiting professor of law at the University of Nottingham since 2007. He was appointed Freeman of the City of London in 2007.

He was head of chambers at Essex Court Chambers from 2017 to 2020.

Judicial career 
He served as a recorder from 2009 to 2020 and a deputy High Court judge from 2016 to 2020.

On 13 January 2020, he was appointed a judge of the High Court and received the customary knighthood in the same year. He was assigned to the Queen's Bench Division and appointed to the Commercial Court. He is on the Financial List, hears cases on the Competition Appeal Tribunal and sits on the Administrative Court. He is currently Judge in Charge of the Commercial Court.

Personal life 
In 1992, he married Heather Crook, with whom he has two sons and two daughters.

References 

Living people
1965 births
21st-century English judges
Alumni of King's College London
Alumni of Magdalen College, Oxford
Members of Gray's Inn
Queen's Bench Division judges
People educated at the Glasgow Academy